The New York City Department of Probation (DOP) is the department of the government of New York City responsible for providing supervision for adults and juveniles placed on probation by judges in the Supreme, Criminal, and Family courts. In addition, Probation officers are responsible for preparing background reports that assist judges in determining appropriate sentences for adult offenders and juvenile delinquents.

Powers and Authority
Probation Officers are New York State peace officers. Its regulations are compiled in title 42 of the New York City Rules.

See also

List of law enforcement agencies in New York
Law enforcement in New York City
New York State Division of Probation and Correctional Alternatives

References

External links
New York City Department of Probation
 Department of Probation in the Rules of the City of New York

Law enforcement agencies of New York City
Probation
Probation departments of the United States
Probation